Pleurothallis arctata is a plant species in the Orchidaceae family.

Distribution 
It is native to Peru. It is found in the Andes around 2200 meters.

Taxonomy 
It was named by Carlyle A. Luer in  Lindleyana 12: 39 in 1997.

References 

arctata